Lakadiya is medium size village located in Ghogha division of Bhavnagar district, Gujarat, India.

References

Villages in Bhavnagar district